Henry II (1102 – 4 December 1128), Margrave of the Nordmark, also Count of Stade (as Henry IV), son of Lothair Udo III, Margrave of the Nordmark, and  Irmgard, daughter of Dietrich, Count of Plötzkau, and Mathilde von Walbeck.

Henry assumed the title of Margrave of the Nordmark in 1114 from Helperich of Plötzkau, who was appointed margrave until Henry came of age. The previous margrave in this dynasty was Henry’s uncle Rudolf I, who was also his guardian.  Rudolf was deposed by Emperor Henry V because of conspiracy against the crown, and was replaced by Helperich as an interim measure.  Henry assumed the titles of Count of Stade and Margrave of the Nordmark in 1114.

Henry was married to Adelaide of Ballenstedt, a daughter of Otto, Count of Ballenstedt, and Eilika of Saxony.  Adelaide was therefore the sister of Albert the Bear. There are no known children as a result of this union.  Henry was succeeded as margrave by the son of Helperich, Conrad of Plötzkau.

Sources 
Krause, Karl Ernst Hermann, Lothar Udo II. und das Stader Grafenhaus. In: Allgemeine Deutsche Biographie. Band 19, Duncker & Humblot, Leipzig, 1884

External links
Medieval Lands Project, Grafen von Stade (family of Lothar)

1102 births
1128 deaths
Counts of Stade
Margraves of the Nordmark
12th-century German nobility